Taiaroa Royal  is the New Zealand dancer and choreographer.

Early life and education 
Royal identifies with the iwi Te Arawa of the Rotorua and Bay of Plenty regions, Ngāti Raukawa, Uenukopako and Kāi Tahu of the South Island. As a teenager at age 15 he won a disco dancing competition in the Bay of Plenty.

Royal is a graduate of the New Zealand School of Dance, finishing in 1984.

Career 
Companies he has performed with as a dancer include the Royal New Zealand Ballet, Douglas Wright Dance Company, Human Garden, Commotion Dance Company, Atamiria and Black Grace, and he has toured to England, Europe, Australia and America.

In 2007, he started the Okareka Dance Company with Taane Mete. Okareka's 2008 show Tama Ma, premiered at the Tempo Dance Festival, Auckland, won awards and went on to tour New Zealand. It had seasons at the Strut Festival, Perth in November 2010 and The Powerhouse, Brisbane in March 2011. Tama Ma had autobiographical elements and was danced by Royal and Taane Mete. It included choreography by Michael Parmenter and Douglas Wright.

He has choreographed operas for New Zealand Opera.

Some of his choreography is commercial such as music videos for Maree Sheehan, Evermore and Ardijah, and event such as Christmas in the Park in Auckland. For the World of Wearable Art event in Wellington he has choreographed the South Pacific section.

Royal has a teaching practice having taught at the New Zealand School of Dance and Unitec Institute of Technology on the Bachelor of Performing Screen Arts.

In the New Zealand Festival in 2020, he collaborated with American dance company Exhale to produce a work called Hōkioi me te Vwōhali From Spirit Eagles Land.

Awards 
 2017 – Awarded a Churchill Fellowship to travel to Cincinnati, to undertake choreographic research with Exhale Dance Tribe to start developing a united choreographic language and voice
 2010 – Te Waka Toi award - Te Tohu Toi Kē a Te Waka Toi, Making a Difference in Contemporary Dance.
 2010 – Tempo Dance Festival - Honouring a Dancer evening.
 2008 – Tama Ma - produced and danced by Royal and Taane Mete won four Tempo Dance Festival awards including ‘Spirit of the Festival’. It was also voted ‘Best Dance’ by Metro Magazine’s ‘Best In Auckland’, 2008.

References 

Living people
New Zealand dancers
New Zealand choreographers
New Zealand School of Dance alumni
Te Arawa people
Ngāti Raukawa people
Ngāi Tahu people
Year of birth missing (living people)